Verocai is a surname, and may refer to;

Verocai is a patronymic derived from the toponym of the Verocai's frazione situated in the comune Cortina d'Ampezzo.

 Arthur Verocai - Brazilian composer, singer, and producer
 Giulio Verocai - Italian ice hockey player

References

External links
Distribution of the surname Verocai in Italy

Rhaeto-Romance surnames
Surnames of Italian origin